Robert Gore may refer to:
Robert Hayes Gore (1886–1972), American politician and newspaper publisher
Robert W. Gore (1937–2020), American engineer and scientist, inventor and businessman
Bobby Gore (1936–2013), American gang leader and activist
Rob Gore (born 1977), American emergency physician
Robert Gore (MP) (1810–1854), Irish member of parliament for New Ross

See also
Gore (disambiguation)
Sir Robert Gore-Booth, 4th Baronet (1805–1876)